Fulvisporium is a monotypic genus of fungi found in the family Microbotryaceae. It contains the sole species Fulvisporium restifaciens.

References

External links

Monotypic Basidiomycota genera
Microbotryales